Valentino Giambelli (8 March 1928 – 27 March 2019) was an Italian footballer and businessman, chairman of A.C. Monza Brianza 1912 from 1980 to 2000.

Football Life
During the Second World War, Giambelli worked as a laborer at the Magneti Marelli of Sesto San Giovanni, and work breaks, playing football in the field company, to be noticed by some scout of the A.C. Pro Sesto.

After the war, and after the junior teams, played for a year in Olginatese (the Olginate team), just outside Lecco. In 1949, went to Pro Lissone, and then finish in Monza Soccer team with whom he won the championship of the C series coming to Serie B.

Giambelli remained 5 years in Monza, but at the age of 27 years decided to discontinue football career and to use the degree of surveyor dedicated to the construction.

References

External links
Site of the building Giambelli

1928 births
2019 deaths
Sportspeople from the Province of Monza e Brianza
Italian footballers
Association football midfielders
Italian football chairmen and investors
S.S.D. Pro Sesto players
People from Brianza
20th-century Italian businesspeople
21st-century Italian businesspeople
Footballers from Lombardy